Sir Robert Clayton, 3rd Baronet ( – 10 May 1799) was an English politician.

He was the only son of Sir Kenrick Clayton, 2nd Baronet of Marden Park, Surrey, whom he succeeded in 1769.

He was a Member of Parliament (MP) for Bletchingley from 1768 to 1783, for Surrey from 1783 to 1784, for Bletchingley again from 1787 to 1796, and for Ilchester from 1796 until his death.

He died in May 1799. He had married Mary, the daughter of Frederick Standert of Greenwich but left no children. The baronetcy was therefore inherited by his first cousin, Sir William Clayton, 4th Baronet, the son of his father's younger brother William.

References 

1740 births
Year of birth uncertain
1799 deaths
Baronets in the Baronetage of Great Britain
Members of the Parliament of Great Britain for English constituencies
British MPs 1768–1774
British MPs 1774–1780
British MPs 1780–1784
British MPs 1784–1790
British MPs 1790–1796
British MPs 1796–1800